Rhodplumsite is a rare rhodium-lead sulfide mineral, chemical formula Rh3Pb2S2. It was originally discovered within a platinum nugget, in grains up to 40 μm in size. Its name originates from its composition; rhodium and lead (plumbum in Latin). Although this mineral contains large amounts of rhodium, it is not an economically viable ore of rhodium due to its rarity.

References

Rhodium minerals
Lead minerals
Sulfide minerals
Trigonal minerals
Minerals in space group 166
Minerals described in 1983